Todd Smith may refer to:

People
Todd Smith (musician), American singer, songwriter and guitarist
Todd Smith (politician), Canadian politician
Todd Smith (singer), American vocalist and member of Selah
Todd Smith (wrestler), American wrestler
Todd Joseph Smith, American bodybuilder
Todd Smith, brother of musician Patti Smith
James Todd Smith, birth name of American rapper LL Cool J

Music
Todd Smith (album), 2006 studio album of LL Cool J
Todd Smith Pt.2: Back to Cool, alternative working name for Exit 13, 2008 studio album of LL Cool J